Red Bridge is a historic structure located northeast of Postville, Iowa, United States. The Allamakee County Engineer designed the timber Pratt through truss structure, and it was erected by a local contractor named A. L. Powell in 1920. Built for $2,304.74, it is composed of timber compression members and forged iron tension members. The structural steel was provided by the Worden-Allen Company of Milwaukee, and City Lumber provided the timbers. At some point it was abandoned and the timber deck and stringers were removed. It is the last uncovered timber truss bridge remaining in Iowa. The bridge was listed on the National Register of Historic Places in 1998.

See also
List of bridges documented by the Historic American Engineering Record in Iowa

References

External links

Bridges completed in 1920
Bridges in Allamakee County, Iowa
Historic American Engineering Record in Iowa
National Register of Historic Places in Allamakee County, Iowa
Road bridges on the National Register of Historic Places in Iowa
Truss bridges in Iowa
Iron bridges in the United States
Wooden bridges in Iowa
Pratt truss bridges in the United States